Putovanje tamnom polutkom is a Croatian film directed by Davor Žmegač. It was released in 1995.

External links
 

1995 films
Croatian war drama films
1990s Croatian-language films
Yugoslav Wars films
Works about the Croatian War of Independence